Jenkins Lutheran Chapel and Cemetery is a historic Lutheran church near Shelbyville, Tennessee.

The church building was completed in 1886. Around 1976 it ceased being used as a church and was renamed "Jenkins Chapel." It is now maintained by a nonprofit religious organization that was established to preserve the building and grounds. It was added to the National Register of Historic Places in 1997.

Three term (1939–45) Tennessee Governor Prentice Cooper (1895–1969) is buried there.

See also
 Shofner's Lutheran Chapel

References

External links
 
 

Lutheran churches in Tennessee
Lutheran cemeteries in the United States
Cemeteries in Tennessee
Properties of religious function on the National Register of Historic Places in Tennessee
Churches completed in 1886
19th-century Lutheran churches in the United States
Buildings and structures in Shelbyville, Tennessee
National Register of Historic Places in Bedford County, Tennessee